William Burton Lewis (October 3, 1895 – March 24, 1950) was a pitcher in Major League Baseball. He appeared in twelve games for  the 1924 Philadelphia Phillies.

References

External links

1895 births
1950 deaths
Major League Baseball pitchers
Philadelphia Phillies players
Baseball players from New York (state)
People from Tonawanda, New York
Baltimore Orioles (IL) players
Beaumont Exporters players
Richmond Colts players
Rochester Tribe players
Toledo Mud Hens players
Burials in New York (state)